Lucyna Winnicka (14 July 1928 – 22 January 2013) was a Polish actress. She appeared in 21 films between 1954 and 1978. She played the lead role in the film Mother Joan of the Angels, which won the Special Jury Prize at the 1961 Cannes Film Festival. In 1967 she was a member of the jury of the 5th Moscow International Film Festival.

Partial filmography

 Pod gwiazda frygijska (1954) - Madzia
 The Real End of the Great War (1957) - Róza Zborska
 Night Train (1959) - Marta
 First Spaceship on Venus (1960) - Fernsehreporterin / Joan Moran
 Knights of the Teutonic Order (1960) - Duchess Anna Danuta of Masovia
 Mother Joan of the Angels (1961) - Mother Joan of the Angels
 Godzina pasowej rózy (1963) - Eleonora
 Pamietnik pani Hanki (1963) - Hanka Niementowska-Renowicka
 Ubranie prawie nowe (1964) - Director's Wife
 Sam posród miasta (1965) - Ewa
 Sposób bycia (1966) - Irena - Wife
 Pharaoh (1966) - Priestess (uncredited)
 Sarajevski atentat (1968) - Sofija
 Gra (1969) - Wife
 322 (1969) - Marta
 Szerelmesfilm (1970) - Ágnes
 Na wylot (1973) - Photo Salon Owner
 Tüzoltó utca 25. (1973) - Maria
 A Woman's Decision (1975) - (uncredited)
 Wieczne  (1975) - Lab Assistant
 Ognie sa jeszcze zywe (1976) - Dr. Wanda Poplawska
 Indeks (1977) - Secretary Marina

References

External links

1928 births
2013 deaths
Polish film actresses
Actresses from Warsaw
20th-century Polish actresses